Georg Schneider (22 April 1892 – 5 January 1961), nicknamed Schorschl, was a German footballer who played as a defender, midfielder or centre-forward and made three appearances for the Germany national team.

Club career
Schneider made his debut for Bayern Munich on 15 August 1910 in the Bavarian championship. He played for the team until 1925, and was named an honorary club captain.

International career
Schneider made his international debut for Germany on 27 June 1920 in a friendly match against Switzerland, which finished as a 1–4 loss in Zürich. He earned three caps in total for Germany, making his final appearance on 5 June 1921 in a friendly against Hungary, which finished as a 0–3 loss in Budapest.

Personal life
Schneider was born in Munich on 22 April 1892. He died on 5 January 1961 at the age of 68.

Career statistics

International

References

General references

External links
 
 
 
 
 

1892 births
1961 deaths
Footballers from Munich
German footballers
Germany international footballers
Association football defenders
Association football midfielders
Association football forwards
FC Bayern Munich footballers